Mitrophora may refer to:
 Mitrophora, a genus of plants in the family Caprifoliaceae; synonym of Valeriana
 Mitrophora, a genus of fungi in the family Morchellaceae; synonym of Morchella